Noble House Film & Television is the operating subsidiary of Noble House Entertainment Inc. Founded by filmmaker Damian Lee and Lowell Conn, Noble House develops, produces and distributes international commercial feature films and television programs.

Damian Lee and Lowell Conn produced and directed films including Woman Wanted, Fun, and The Poet.

Film production companies of the United States